Tomari is a coastal town and the administrative center of Tomarinsky District in Sakhalin Oblast, Russia, located on the western coast of the Sakhalin Island,  northwest of Yuzhno-Sakhalinsk, the administrative center of the oblast. As of the 2010 Census, its population was 4,541.

History
The bay on which Tomari now stands was visited between July 12 and 14, 1787 by two French frigates, Boussole and Astrolabe, commanded by Lapérouse. The French named it Langle Bay after the captain of the Astrolabe. At that time, it was no more than a small cluster of huts. The French had good relations with the local people who they considered to be in the very distant past of northern Chinese origin, describing them as intelligent, good-looking, and short in stature. The locals were engaged primarily in fishing, hunting, and herding, with hardly any agriculture. They traded regularly with the communities on the Amur River on the mainland and with Japan. Lapérouse gives a very detailed description of his relations with these people in his work Voyage de Laperouse Autour du Monde, published in 1797.

Modern Tomari was founded in 1870. It reverted to the Soviet Union in 1945 and was granted town status and renamed Tomari in 1946. Tomari is one of the only Ainu place names in Sakhalin that wasn't renamed from the Japanese administration era.

Administrative and municipal status
Within the framework of administrative divisions, Tomari serves as the administrative center of Tomarinsky District and is subordinated to it. As a municipal division, the town of Tomari and thirteen rural localities of Tomarinsky District are incorporated as Tomarinsky Urban Okrug.

Economy
Fish, coil, and timber are extracted in the town. The largest industrial facility in the town, a paper factory, went bankrupt in the mid-1990s; its collapse provoked a large emigration.

Transportation
The town lies on the railway connecting Kholmsk with Ilyinskoye.

Sister city
 Teshio, Hokkaido, Japan

References

Notes

Sources

Cities and towns in Sakhalin Oblast
Populated coastal places in Russia